Bagny  is a village in the administrative district of Gmina Dąbrowa Białostocka in Sokółka County, Podlaskie Voivodeship, northeastern Poland.

References

Bagny